Means to an End is the eighth studio album by American band Biohazard. Guitarist Scott Roberts, formerly of the Cro-Mags and the Spudmonsters, is featured on this album having replaced Carmine Vincent during Biohazard's previous tour schedules.

Track listing

Personnel
Evan Seinfeld: vocals, bass
Billy Graziadei: vocals, guitars
Scott Roberts: guitars
Danny Schuler: drums, percussion

Production 
Produced and engineered by Billy Graziadei, Scott Roberts and Danny Schuler
Assistants: Joe Pucciarelli, Mike Turner
Mixed and mastered by Ed Stasium

References

Biohazard (band) albums
2005 albums
SPV/Steamhammer albums